Middle Letaba Dam is an earth-fill type dam located on the Middle Letaba River, 40 km east of Elim and 40 km west of Giyani, Limpopo, South Africa. The source of the Middle Letaba river rises high in the tropical mountains of Magoebaskloof near Tzaneen, where rainfall is abundant during the summer months. The river passes numerous villages and its flow becomes quite strong when it reaches the village of Magoro.

When in full capacity, the Middle Letaba becomes Limpopo's third largest dam, but the Middle Letaba Dam only reaches its full capacity when the river is in flood. The dam seldom reaches its full capacity because the engineers overestimated the yield of the river feeding the dam. The error in the assessment also resulted in water shortages for competing water users.

Construction of the dam started in 1980 under Gazankulu government and serves mainly for water supply to Giyani and Hlanganani. The dam is situated alongside the R578 road to Giyani and Elim. The hazard potential of the dam has been ranked high (3). The dam is popularly known as 'Sterkrivier Dam' by the local people, the name Sterkrivier (Strong river) was given by the Afrikaner people, it is said that before the construction of the dam in 1980, the water that used to flow in this river was so powerful to an extent that a new name was given to the river, hence 'Sterkrivier'.

See also
List of reservoirs and dams in South Africa
List of rivers of South Africa

References 

 List of South African Dams from the Department of Water Affairs and Forestry (South Africa)

Dams in South Africa
Dams completed in 1984